The 2017–18 Slovenian Basketball League, also known as Liga Nova KBM due to sponsorship reasons, was the 27th season of the Premier A Slovenian Basketball League. Olimpija are the defending champions.

Format
The number of teams was reduced from 12 to only 10 for the 2017–18 season.

Regular season
In the first phase, ten teams competed in a home-and-away round-robin series (18 games total). All teams advanced from the regular season to one of two postseason stages, depending on their league position.

Second phase
The top eight teams from the regular season advanced to the championship phase. These teams started the second phase from scratch, with no results carrying over from the regular season. Each team played a total of 14 games in this phase; as in the regular season, a home-and-away round-robin was used.

The top four teams at the end of this stage advanced to the semifinals, conducted as a best-of-three playoff. The semifinal winners advanced to the best-of-five championship finals, with the winners being crowned league champion.

Playouts
The bottom two teams entered a home-and-away round-robin mini-league with the first, second, third, and fourth-placed teams from the second division, with the two teams finishing on top of the mini-league taking up a place in the next year's 1. A SKL.

Teams
Ilirija was promoted as the winner of the 2016–17 Second League. The team from Ljubljana replaced Terme Olimia Podčetrtek, LTH Castings and Portorož, which finished in the last three positions in the 2016–17 season.

Venues and locations

Personnel and kits

Managerial changes

Regular season

Standings

Second stage

Championship group

Relegation group

Playoffs

Awards

Regular Season MVP
 Smiljan Pavič (Šenčur)

Season MVP
 Smiljan Pavič (Šenčur)

Finals MVP
 Devin Oliver (Petrol Olimpija)

Weekly MVP

Regular season

Note

 – Co-MVP's were announced.

Second round

Note

 – Co-MVP's were announced.

Statistical leaders

| width=50% valign=top |

Points

|}
|}

| width=50% valign=top |

Assists

|}
|}

Clubs in European competitions

References

External links
Slovenian Basketball Federation

Slovenian Basketball League seasons
Slovenia
1